The Château de Vaurenard is a château in Gleizé, Rhône, France. The land was acquired by 1672, and it is owned by a descendant of the same family.

The château was built in the 17th and 18th centuries. It has been listed as an official historical monument since November 12, 2007. The château produces wine from vines grown on 25 hectares surrounding the property.

References

1672 establishments in France
Châteaux in Rhône (department)
Monuments historiques of Auvergne-Rhône-Alpes